This article lists the results and fixtures for the Bahrain women's national football team.
The national team's first activity was in 2005, when they debuted by participating in 2005 WAFF Women's Championship in Jordan, in which they faced Jordan, Syria, Iran and Palestine. the team finished 4th at their first try, the committee put in a request to FIFA for a licensed female coach to lead the team. As a result, German coach Monika Staab was sent to Bahrain on January 21, 2007 for a six-month development program. Under the guidance of Staab, the team played its first official FIFA approved match on April 22, 2007, against the national team of Maldives in Malé, Maldives. During this match, Bahrain played a great game and secured a historic 7–0 win. Bahrain is currently ranked 86th in the FIFA Women's World Rankings. Bahrain to date is the best women's national team in the GCC regions, the team has gone on to attain many achievements; most notably through its participation and podium finishes in all recent tournaments.

Record per opponent
Key

The following table shows Bahrain' all-time official international record per opponent:

Last updated: Bahrain vs Chinese Taiper, 24 October 2021.

2005

2007

2010

2011

2013

2014

2015

2016

2017

2018

2019

2021

See also
Bahrain national football team results

References

External links
 Bahrain  results on The Roon Ba
  Bahrain  results on Globalsports
 Bahrain  results on worldfootball.net
 Bahrain  results on Xscores

2010s in Bahrain
2020s in Bahrain
Women's national association football team results